Erythroxylum ruizii is a species of plant in the Erythroxylaceae family. It is endemic to Ecuador.  Its natural habitat is subtropical or tropical dry forests.

References

ruizii
Endemic flora of Ecuador
Endangered plants
Taxonomy articles created by Polbot
Taxa named by Johann Joseph Peyritsch